This page is a complete chronological listing of VFL/AFL minor premiers. The Australian Football League (AFL), known as the Victorian Football League (VFL) until 1990, is the elite national competition in men's Australian rules football.

The team that finishes the home-and-away season on top of the premiership ladder is known as the "minor premier". Between 1991 and 2022, the McClelland Trophy was also awarded to the minor premier. Finishing on top of the ladder provides seeding benefits during the AFL finals series, and the main league award is the AFL premiership, which is awarded to the winner of the AFL Grand Final.

As of 2022, 66 minor premiers have won the VFL/AFL premiership, 43 have finished as runners-up, and 17 have finished third, failing to qualify for the grand final. The success rate of minor premiers winning the major premiership has reduced greatly since 1994, when the finals series was expanded to eight clubs and the benefits enjoyed by the minor premier in bye weeks and double-chances during the finals were reduced and diluted; between 1994 and 2022, only ten minor premiers have gone on to win the premiership.

List of minor premiers
The following is a list of minor premiers, ladder details and results.

Minor premiership wins

Minor premiership records
 Most consecutive minor premierships: 6 (1955–1960)
 Longest minor premiership drought:  years ( / ; never won a minor premiership)

See also
 List of VFL/AFL premiers
 List of AFL Women's minor premiers

References

External links
 VFL/AFL season summaries

Australian Football League
Australian rules football-related lists